Aakula is a Finnish surname meaning "Augie's farm". Notable people with the surname include:

 Eemeli Aakula (1879–1955), Finnish politician
 Pekka Aakula (1866–1928), Finnish politician

Finnish-language surnames